A Ver-o-Mar, Aver-o-Mar or Averomar is an urban area in Póvoa de Varzim. It is a former civil parish currently located in União das Freguesias de Aver-o-Mar, Amorim e Terroso, of which it is its seat. In the census of 2001, it had a population of 8,675 inhabitants and a total area of 5.21 km2. A 2012 law merged the parish with neighbouring Amorim and Terroso, becoming the northern parish of the city of Póvoa de Varzim.

Aver-o-Mar naming is unknown, although the current form means "watching the sea" in Portuguese. This is a misinterpretation of the name made in early 20th century. The ancient people's Abremar pronunciation is still common and Averomar form is becoming popular, used in the new crest and by the local football association, the Averomar F.C.

History

A Ver-o-Mar was once a fishing-farmer village in the north of the city of Póvoa de Varzim, Abonemar is the oldest name of A Ver-o-Mar and dates from 1099. The settlement of the place started with the medieval knight Lourenço Fernandes da Cunha, of the Honour of Varzim. In ecclesiastical terms, it was part of the parish of Amorim, although in the 17th century it was annexed to the town of Póvoa de Varzim due to a growing community of fishing-farmers and the growing importance of Póvoa de Varzim. It became an independent parish from Amorim in 1922.

In late 20th century, the parish became urbanized as a consequence of north expansion of Bairro Norte of the city of Póvoa de Varzim. Despite being included in the urban area of the city of Póvoa de Varzim since the 1995 city limits expansion, the parish gained town status on July 1, 2003. In January 2006, the national government approved and recognized the extension of the city of Póvoa de Varzim to this and three other parishes.

Geography
Cape Santo André is located in the north of the parish. Esteiro River divides the parish in two parts: North and South. The south of Aver-o-mar is grouped with the north of Bairro Norte and is known as Agro-Velho and is an urban and beach resort district. On the other hand, Santo André (today considered the extreme north of the city) in the north shoreline of the parish has retained its old fishing character related with Bairro Sul (in the extreme south). The centre of Aver-o-Mar is located around Nossa Senhora das Neves Avenue.

Hamlets
The parish has 18 hamlets: Agro-Velho, Aldeia Nova, Boucinha, Caramuja, Fontes Novas, Fragosa, Mourincheira, Paço, Paranho, Paranho de Areia, Palmeiro, Perlinha, Finisterra, Paralheira, Refojos, Sencadas, Santo André, and Sesins.

City districts
The parish of Aver-o-mar contains three of the eleven city districts:
A Ver-o-Mar
Agro-Velho (north part)
Parque da Cidade (west part)

Former civil parishes of Póvoa de Varzim
Neighbourhoods of Póvoa de Varzim